Ambulyx canescens is a moth of the family Sphingidae first described by Francis Walker in 1865.

Distribution 
It is found in Indochina, Malaysia, Sumatra, Java, Borneo and the Philippines.

Description

Biology 
It is considered a forest pest, because its larvae feed on the leaves of young Dryobalanops lanceolata. Larvae have also been reared on Shorea lepidota.

List of subspecies 
 Ambulyx canescens canescens
 Ambulyx canescens flava (Clark, 1924)
 Ambulyx canescens flavocelebensis

References

External links
"Ambulyx canescens canescens (Walker, [1865)"]. (May 25, 2009). Butterfly from Rejang Land. Retrieved January 11, 2019.

Ambulyx
Moths described in 1865
Moths of Asia